Mujan may refer to:
 Mujan, Qom (موجان - Mūjān)
 Mujan, Sistan and Baluchestan (موجن - Mūjan)Hulle